The 2021 Big Ten men's soccer tournament was the 31st edition of the tournament. As the tournament champion, Penn State earned the Big Ten Conference's automatic berth into the 2021 NCAA Division I men's soccer tournament.

Seeding 

Seeding was determined by regular season conference record points per game.

Bracket

Schedule

Quarterfinals

Semifinals

Final

Statistics

Goalscorers

All-Tournament team

Source:

* Offensive MVP
^ Defensive MVP

References

External links 
 Big Ten Conference Men's Soccer
 Big Ten Men's Soccer Tournament Central

Big Ten Men's Soccer Tournament
Big Ten Conference Men's Soccer Tournament
2021 in sports in Indiana
2021 in sports in Maryland
2021 in sports in Michigan
2021 in sports in Pennsylvania